Simone Sibilio do Nascimento is a Brazilian human rights activist. She is a  prosecutor in the Rio de Janeiro State's Public Ministry (MPRJ).She works against combating organized crime and public corruption, militias, and drug trafficking. She was awarded the  International Women of Courage Award in 2022.

References

Recipients of the International Women of Courage Award
Year of birth missing (living people)
Living people
Brazilian human rights activists